Yanesha' may refer to:
the Yanesha' people
the Yanesha' language